The Beaumont Tower is a structure on the campus of Michigan State University, designed by the architectural firm of Donaldson and Meier and completed in 1928. The  tower marks the site of College Hall, the first building constructed on the campus, as well as the first building in America erected for instruction in scientific agriculture. Due to poor construction, College Hall collapsed in 1918.  John W. Beaumont, an 1882 alumnus of MSU, proposed the construction of the monument to conserve the Campus Circle and serve as a monument to teaching.

Description

During its dedication ceremony, the president of the college described the Beaumont Tower as "a meeting or trysting place of the students, student groups or organizations, the center of all the activities of this institution". The tower was also to serve as a time piece for the university, directing students' daily activities by sounding hourly.

The tower, designed in the Collegiate Gothic architectural style, features The Sower, an Art Deco bas-relief by sculptor Lee Lawrie (1922), with the inscription "Whatsoever a Man Soweth" (from Galatians 6:7). This serves as a tribute both to MSU's origins as an agricultural college and to the seminal nature of knowledge.

Beaumont also houses a full carillon, with 49 bells. Originally the tower had only ten bells but over time additional bells were added until a full range of music could be played from these.  The bells now play frequently throughout the day activated by a computer.  The Campus Circle where the tower is located often serves as a gathering place for students where free concerts on the lawn are available in the summer. The Beaumont Tower is one of the most recognizable and most photographed landmarks on the MSU campus. Its likeness as a line drawing is used on MSU letterhead.  Special performances using the carillon are provided for specific occasions.

The northeast finial is higher than the other three. The missing finials represent the need for higher education.

The tower is also the meeting place for the executive board of the Michigan State University Tower Guard. The Tower Guard, founded in 1934 by May Shaw, the wife of former MSU president Robert Shaw, is MSU’s oldest and one of the most respected student organizations on campus. It was originally a female honor society that was a service-oriented organization which would help to serve the needs of visually impaired students at Michigan State University. In 1977, membership was opened to the outstanding young men on campus in addition to women. Each year, the top sophomores are chosen to carry on the tradition based on their academic excellence, leadership, outstanding character, and commitment to service.

Gallery

See also
 List of carillons in the United States

References

Further reading
Hendry, Fay, L., Balthazar Korab, photographs, (1980), Outdoor Sculpture of Lansing, Iota Press, Okemos, Michigan

External links

The Greater Lansing Convention & Visitors Bureau
Beaumont Tower - a short CNN article
Beaumont Tower: At the Crossroads of Past, Present & Future - MSU Alumni Association article
M.A.C. - College Hall
MSU Tower Guard
Michigan State:A Virtual Tour
Beaumont Tower: At the Crossroads of Past, Present & Future

Michigan State University campus
East Lansing, Michigan
Bell towers in the United States
Carillons
Towers in Michigan
Towers completed in 1928
1928 establishments in Michigan